Siobhán is a female given name of Irish origin. The most common anglicisations are Siobhan (identical to the Irish spelling but omitting the  acute accent over the 'a'), Shevaun and Shivaun. A now uncommon spelling variant is Siubhán.

The name first appears in the surviving Irish annals in the early fourteenth century.

This Greek name is a feminine form of the Greek , which is in turn a shortened form of the Hebrew  

The popularity of the actress Siobhán McKenna (1923–1986) helped the resurgence of the name in the 20th century.

The Scottish Gaelic form of the name is Siobhàn, (which is sometimes anglicised Judith).

People
Siobhan Baillie (born 1981), British politician
Siobhan Benita (born 1971), British politician and former civil servant
Siobhan Brooks, American sociologist
Siobhan Byrne (born 1984), German-born Irish sabre fencer
Siobhan Chamberlain (born 1983), British footballer
 Shivaune Christina, Australian former model and Miss Earth Australia 2003
 Siobhán Cleary, Irish composer
 Siobhán Coady, Canadian politician and businesswoman
 Siobhán Creaton, Irish journalist
 Siobhan Davies, English choreographer
 Siobhan de Maré, singer-songwriter
 Siobhan Dillon, English singer
 Siobhán Donaghy, Irish singer formerly of the Sugababes
 Siobhan Dowd, English writer
 Siobhan Fahey, Irish singer who was a member of Bananarama and Shakespears Sister
 Siobhan Fallon Hogan, American actress
 Siobhan Finneran, English actress
 Siobhan Haughey, Irish-Hong Kong Olympic swimmer
 Siobhan Hayes, British actress
 Siobhán Hapaska, Irish sculptor
 Siobhan Healy (born 1976), Scottish artist
 Siobhán Hoey, Irish sportswoman
 Siobhan Hunter, Scottish footballer
 Siobhan Karam, Canadian ice dancer
 Siobhán Killeen, Irish footballer
 Siobhan Leachman, New Zealand citizen scientist
 Siobhan MacGowan, Anglo-Irish singer
 Siobhan Magnus, American contestant on American Idol, Season 9.
 Siobhan Maher Kennedy, singer
 Siobhan Marshall, New Zealand actress
 Siobhán McCarthy, Irish actress of musical theater
 Siobhan McColl, South African figure skater
 Siobhain McDonagh (born 1960), British Labour Party MP
 Siobhan McGarry, Northern Irish television presenter
 Siobhán McHugh, Irish-Australian author, podcaster and documentary-maker
 Siobhán McKenna, Irish, Tony Award-winning actress
 Siobhán McSweeney, Irish actress
 Siobhan Miller, Scottish folk singer
 Shevaun Mizrahi, Turkish-American documentary filmmaker
 Siobhán O'Brien, Irish singer-songwriter
 Siobhán O'Hanlon, Irish activist
 Siobhán Parkinson, Irish author of several children's books, including Kathleen: The Celtic Knot
 Siobhan Paton, Australian Paralympic swimmer
 Siobhan Reddy, British video game executive
 Siobhan Redmond, Scottish actress
 Siobhan Roberts, Canadian science journalist
 Siobhan Thompson, CollegeHumor writer
 Siobhan Wescott, Alaskan Athabaskan educator
 Siobhan Williams, Canadian actress

Fictional characters
 Siobhan, one of Christopher's teachers at school in Mark Haddon's The Curious Incident of the Dog in the Night-Time
 Siobhan, a female vampire appearing in the last book of Twilight by Stephenie Meyer
 Siobhan Andrews, a smart third-grader in the television series Hey Arnold!
 Siobhan Beckett, a character from the science fiction series Earth: Final Conflict
 Siobhan Brody, mother of Roarke's mother in J. D. Robb's In Death novels
Siobhan Clarke, Detective Sergeant in Ian Rankin's John Rebus novels
 Siobhan Kelly, deputy in the Cinemax series Banshee
 Siobhan Martin, one of the twin sisters portrayed by Sarah Michelle Gellar in the short-lived drama Ringer
 Siobhan McDougal, also known as Silver Banshee, a DC Comics supervillain
 Siobhan Pattinson, one of the two main characters of the LGBT webcomic Outsiders 
 Siobhan "Shiv" Roy, the daughter of patriarch Logan Roy on the HBO series Succession
Siobhan, Cassidy's girlfriend and character from J Kenner's Stark International trilogy. Also appears in Deepest kiss, Hold me, Wicked Grind, Sweetest Taboo and Anchor me.
 Siobhan Ryan, daughter of Maeve and Johnny Ryan on the American daytime soap opera Ryan's Hope from 1978 to 1989
 Siobhan Sadler, also known as "Mrs. S" a foster mother to two of the main characters in the television series Orphan Black
 Siobhan Sharpe, head of brand for the Olympic Deliverance Commission in the BBC television series Twenty Twelve
 Shevaun Tillman, a character in  James Clavell's novel Tai-Pan
 Siobhan O'Brien, a character in  Sung J. Woo's novel Skin Deep
Siobhan Sheehan, character in HBO series “Mare of Easttown”
Siobhán, the lead character in the 2019 film, Sea Fever.
Siobhan Kelly, a character in Beth O'Leary's "The No-Show"
Siobhan Klaxon, a character in the 2022 stop-motion horror comedy film, Wendell & Wild
Siobhán Súilleabháin, a character in the 2022 comedy-drama film, The Banshees of Inisherin

Diminutive
Siobhán has a corresponding diminutive form,  (after French ). Examples of this name include singer Sinéad O'Connor.

References

External links
 Index of Names in Irish Annals: Siobhán

Irish-language feminine given names
English-language feminine given names